Susan Scott (born 26 September 1977) is a Scottish track and field athlete who competed for Great Britain at the 2008 Olympic Games in the 1500 metres. She also finished fourth in the 800 metres final at the Commonwealth Games in 2002 and 2006.

Scott was born in Irvine, North Ayrshire, Scotland. Representing Scotland, she finished fourth in the 800 metres final at the Commonwealth Games in Manchester 2002 and Melbourne 2006. In both finals, she broke the Scottish record. In running 1:59.30 in the 2002 final, she improved her best by over a second and broke the longest standing Scottish track record to become the first Scots woman to run under two minutes. The previous record of 2:00.15 by Rosemary Stirling, had stood for 30 years. Scott improved on this in the 2006 final with 1:59.02, which stood as the Scottish record until 2014, when Lynsey Sharp ran 1:58.80. As of 2015, Scott ranks 11th on the UK all-time list. Her 1500 metres best of 4:07.00, was set in June 2008. At the 2008 Beijing Olympics, she was eliminated in the heats of the 1500 metres.

International competitions

References
Sports Reference

1977 births
Living people
Sportspeople from Irvine, North Ayrshire
Scottish female middle-distance runners
Olympic athletes of Great Britain
Athletes (track and field) at the 2008 Summer Olympics
Commonwealth Games competitors for Scotland
Athletes (track and field) at the 2002 Commonwealth Games
Athletes (track and field) at the 2006 Commonwealth Games
World Athletics Championships athletes for Great Britain